The Australian Radiation Protection and Nuclear Safety Agency (ARPANSA) is a regulatory agency under the national Commonwealth government of Australia that aims to protect Australian citizens from both ionising and non-ionising radiation. ARPANSA works under the guidance of the Australian Radiation Protection and Nuclear Safety Act of 1998 as the national regulatory body of radiation in Australia, with independent departments within each state and territory that regulate radiation within each of their jurisdictions.

Responsibilities 
ARPANSA's responsibilities include:

 Regulating the use of ionising radiation
 Setting national standards for radiation use
 Protecting citizens from radiation exposure
 Promoting the safe use of radiation in medicine
 Enforcing national radiation standards
 Providing advice to the Australian government and community about radiation or nuclear issues

ARPANSA evaluates research conducted by the International Commission on Non-Ionizing Radiation Protection (ICNIRP) and other foundations to set standards founded on extensive research.

Radiation in Australia 
Both ionising and non-ionising radiation is present in Australia, and can be found from man-made sources, or in natural sources as background radiation. Ionising radiation is radiation that does not exceed wavelengths over 100 nanometres, whereas non-ionising radiation exceeds wavelengths of 100 nanometres. Some of the common man-made sources of ionising radiation in Australia include x-rays, CT scans and naturally-found radioactive materials. The common sources of non-ionising radiation include mobile phones, power lines and the sun.

The average Australian is exposed annually to radiation at a level of 1,500-2,000 μSv, which is low in comparison to other countries, such as the 7,8000 μSv annual level reported in Cornwall, United Kingdom. These amounts are considered to be natural background radiation levels and exposure to this is not harmful, but radiation can also be used for a variety of health-related purposes. Unlike natural background radiation, there are several risks involved with radiation and nuclear services when used for medical purposes, including increased cancer prevalence. Because of these risks, an agency is required to manage and regulate their use to ensure the safety of all Australians.

History 
From 1935–1972, the authorising body governing radiation in Australia was the Commonwealth X-Ray and Radium Laboratory. This was replaced by the Commonwealth Radiation Laboratory (1972–1973), and then the Australian Radiation Laboratory (1973–1999). In 1999, the Australian Radiation Laboratory then merged with the Nuclear Safety Bureau to create one agency that governed radiation and nuclear safety, ARPANSA. Since its establishment, ARPANSA has erected offices both in Sydney, NSW, and Melbourne, Victoria.

Services 
ARPANSA sets national radiation standards that must be abided by all Australian businesses. ARPANSA consults other health agencies globally, as well as research from relevant disciplines, and forms the standards based on this evidence. The standards are then founded on the recommendations from the ICNIRP based on their years of research. The IAEA’s standards are also considered when setting ARPANSA’s standards, and are established to assign responsibility of safe methods with use of ionising radiation.

All standards set by ARPANSA must also be assessed by the Australian government, such as the standard for radiofrequency electromagnetic radiation (RF EMR) that was set by ARPANSA in 2002. This standard specified that adverse health effects can be avoided with RF EMR levels within the range of 3 kHz- 300 GHz. This rigorous process has not been utilised for standards surrounding ionising radiation, as it does not currently have an identified threshold for harm.

ARPANSA monitors compliance with their regulations and standards through regular inspections of radiological businesses. ARPANSA also holds the ability to make actions if non-compliance is recognised. Of the radiological licenses monitored by ARPANSA, there are over 65,000 individual sources and 36 facilities, with many of these operated by the Australian Nuclear Science and Technology Organisation.

The agency also aids Australian citizens by publishing daily solar ultraviolet radiation (UVR) levels for many locations in Australia. This UV radiation index is based on data received by ARPANSA's UV detectors from cities through Australia which continuously collect data and update the site each minute. This information also provides data for the Cancer Council’s SunSmart App. ARPANSA also works with the Cancer Council by providing testing of clothing, sunglasses and shade cloths, and provides labels to indicate when a product fits Australian sun-protective standards.

Structure 
The most senior staff member of ARPANSA is the CEO, who is always appointed by the Governor-General, and each term as CEO cannot exceed five years. The CEO is currently Dr Gillian Hirth, who was appointed in March 2022. The majority of activities are regulated by the individual state and territory departments, with ARPANSA only regulating six different commonwealth entities. ARPANSA then assists the state/territory regulatory bodies to assure that radiation protection requirements are uniform nation-wide within Australia.
The individual regulatory bodies are as follows:

 NSW EPA
QLD Health
 VIC Department of Health and Human Services
 SA EPA
 TAS Department of Health
 WA Radiological Council
 NT Department of Health

Under the ARPANS Act of 1998, the founding of ARPANSA also established the formation of the Radiation Health and Safety Advisory Council, the Radiation Health Committee and the Nuclear Safety Committee. All of these groups consist of the CEO and an individual to represent the interests of the general public, as well as other specialty members.

The functions of the Radiation Health and Safety Advisory Council include identifying emerging issues relating to radiation protection and nuclear safety and examine concerning matters, among others. The members include:

 Two radiation control officers
 An individual nominated by the chief minister of the NT
 Eight other members

The functions of the Radiation Health Committee include developing national standards for radiation protection and create policies to adhere by, among others. The members include:

 A radiation control officer from each state/territory
 A nuclear safety committee representative
 Two other members

The Nuclear Safety Committee reviews and assesses the effectiveness of the current standards and codes, and to advise the CEO of any issues relating to nuclear safety. The members include:

 A radiation health committee representative
 A local government representative
 Eight other members

Acclaim 
After a new quality testing system was implemented at ARPANSA, the agency was accredited by the National Association of Testing Authorities (NATA) to ISO/IEC 17025 in 2007. After the new accreditation, ARPANSA calibration reports then became recognised internationally under the Mutual Recognition Arrangement (MRA).

In 2018, the director general of the Radiation and Nuclear Safety Authority in Finland, Petteri Tiipana, stated that "Australia has demonstrated a strong commitment to continuous improvement in nuclear and radiation safety and in regulatory oversight of such facilities and activities". Following this in 2019, the deputy CEO and head of radiation health services at ARPANSA was appointed chair the United Nations Scientific Committee on the Effects of Atomic Radiation (UNSCEAR). The position was previously held by Dr Hans Vanmarcke of the Nuclear Research Centre in Belgium and will be chaired by Dr Gillian Hirth of ARPANSA for sessions 66 and 67 in 2019 and 2020. The appointment of Dr Hirth to UNSCEAR was considered to be a recognition of her expertise and leadership in radiation health.

Since the 1980s, ARPANSA has had an ongoing collaboration with Cancer Council Victoria (CCV). This collaboration has included collaborating on research to increase understanding on protective sun behaviours and raise awareness about exposure to radiation. In 2016, ARPANSA and CCV signed a Memorandum of Understanding to improve health in regards to radiation exposure and solar ultraviolet radiation. In 2017, ARPANSA were then recognised as a SunSmart workplace by the then Assistant Minister for Health Dr David Gillespie. Prior to this recognition, CCV had only recognised schools and childhood centres in their commitment to protect staff from UV radiation. CCV’s Prevention Director Craig Sinclair commented that the recognition came at a good time due to it occurring during National Skin Cancer Action Week.

Criticisms and controversies

2005 audit 
From the ANAO audit in 2005, ARPANSA was found to lack a systematic approach to planning, as well as performing monitoring radiological activities. From this audit, ANAO made 19 recommendations, but limited work was made by ARPANSA to enact these, with only 11 being adequately implemented by the following audit in 2014. One of the ANAO comments from the audit stated that ARPANSA's operational objectives are too vague to be assessable.

Lucas Heights nuclear reactor 

In 2010–2011, ARPANSA was publicly criticised in regards to allegations surrounding the nuclear reactor at Lucas Heights in Sydney. Claims in 2010 arose alleging that safety operational breaches were occurring at the nuclear reactor in Sydney. ARPANSA then released conflicting reports regarding the safety and operational breach claims, denying their existence. Late in 2010, these breaches were confirmed by Australia’s workplace regulator, COMCARE.

In March 2011, ARPANSA went under review again due to safety breaches and bullying occurring at the nuclear reactor. Then Science Minister, Kim Carr, was in charge of the departmental investigation into the relationship between ARPANSA and ANSTO. Later in July 2011, ARPANSA and ANSTO were investigated by the fraud control and audit branch of the department of health, who questioned their impartiality. Whistle-blowers gave reports to the Department of Health that alleged that the relationship between the companies was causing safety reports to be compromised. The Health Department questioned the impartiality of ARPANSA, which then led to a review of ARPANSA's regulatory powers by the federal government.

Criticisms of ARPANSA halted from 2011–2019, until workers at the nuclear reactor were exposed to unsafe doses of radiation in 2019. In April 2019, the nuclear facility was only granted permission to produce limited amounts of Molybdenum-99, but ARPANSA permitted full production on 13 June. Two weeks later, on 21 June, two workers were creating a Molybdenum-99 isotope when radioactive contamination was detected outside their working space. One of the workers touched the substance with their hand as they were removing their gloves, and the other worker made contact with their fingertips. At the time, it was unclear how much radiation the workers were exposed to, but was estimated by ANSTO to be equivalent to a single medical radiation treatment.  Both ARPANSA and COMCARE were required to investigate the incident, and the final report released by ARPANSA stated that the radiation exposure received by the workers was two to three times above the statutory annual limit for hands.

5G in Australia 

From 2019 with the introduction of 5G in Australia, ARPANSA faced criticisms from the media and general public, amid fears that the technology was not safe. As of September 2019, Telstra and other telecommunications companies had declared that the use of 5G was safe for citizens, but ARPANSA had yet to comment on these claims. At that point in time, ARPANSA had only acknowledged the existence of concerns surrounding 5G technology, and were in regular discussions with multiple stakeholders to increase public understanding.

Citizens criticised ARPANSA for their alliance with the telecommunications companies, and possibly acting in their interests rather than the health of citizens. In response, ARPANSA stated in June that they worked "independently from other parts of government and are not funded by industry", and are defined within the umbrella of a health agency, not a communications agency like Telstra. Opposing this, ARPANSA's official website declares they are not a health body and take no responsibility for the advice they have provided.

ARPANSA then made a statement declaring that the evidence shows that the levels of electromagnetic energy (EME) from devices like mobile phones do not pose a health risk to citizens. ARPANSA had set the standards for EME levels, and from the initial testing in 2016–2017, the EME levels for 5G were 1,000 times lower than the set standard. ARPANSA then advised the Australian government that 5G was safe, stating that the levels of 5G signals were less than 1% of the maximum radiation level considered safe for citizens in Australia. In response to this public turmoil questioning the safety of 5G, the Morrison government then announced additional funding to ARPANSA to allow for continuing research on 5G and other emerging technologies.

See also

Australian Nuclear Science and Technology Organisation

References

External links
 

Commonwealth Government agencies of Australia
Scientific organisations based in Australia
Standards of Australia
1999 establishments in Australia
Government agencies established in 1999
Radiation protection organizations